The iHeartRadio MMVAs were an annual awards show broadcast annually on Much from 1990 to 2018 that honoured the year's best music videos

Originally debuting in 1990 as the Canadian Music Video Awards, the awards were renamed in 1995 to the MuchMusic Video Awards. In 2016, the show was rebranded under the iHeartRadio banner after Much's parent company, Bell Media, reached a licensing agreement with iHeartMedia. The show's full name was officially dropped in 2018. The 2018 edition would ultimately be the last, amidst the scaling back and, eventual, discontinuation of all music programming on the channel due to declining ratings.

History

1990–1995: As the Canadian Music Video Awards
The first Canadian Music Video Awards took place in 1990 on a three-week trip aboard a Canadian National Railway train across Canada. It was sponsored by Diet Pepsi and the train was dubbed "The Pepsi Train". Awards were handed out during its journey, which included 10 Canadian cities. In 1992 the CMVA's moved to the CityTV/MuchMusic studios in Toronto. In 1993 Michael Kennedy, director, and Kids In The Hall crowded into the Speaker's Corner booth outside the MuchMusic studios to accept the award for Best Comedy Video for "Terriers".

1996–2015: MMVAs

In their modern form, the MMVAs are held as a large street party around 299 Queen Street West—the main downtown Toronto studios of Much and other properties owned by its parent company Bell Media. Much VJs introduce and interview presenters and winners throughout the show. Winners of a Much Music Video Award receive a statue made by New York firm, Society Awards. Viewers can vote for the Fan Fave category which includes Video, Artist or Group, and International Artist or Group.

In 2001, a show was not held due to the September 11 attacks occurring two weeks prior. However, awards were still handed out. All MMVA shows were subsequently held in June until 2017.

2016–2018: iHeartRadio MMVAs
In 2016, Bell Media signed an exclusive pact with iHeartMedia and began co-branding the awards with iHeartRadio to "further elevate the MMVAs internationally."

In 2018, the show moved to August and its full name "MuchMusic Video Awards" was dropped. According to CTV Toronto, Bell Media "hopes the shift will help establish a new back-to-school event."

The iHeartRadio MMVAs were not held in 2019 & 2020. Bell Media president Randy Lennox told The Canadian Press that the awards were "delayed" due to "a massive concert in August and also the MTV awards were one day after our date, so we didn't think it was smart."

List of Ceremonies

Appearances

Performances

Presenters

Awards

Current 

Video of the Year
Best Director
Best Post Production
Best Pop Video
Best Rock/Alternative Video
Best Hip Hop Video
Best EDM/Dance Video
Best MuchFACT Video

Best International Artist
Most Buzzworthy International Artist or Group
Most Buzzworthy Canadian
Fan Fave Video
Fan Fave Artist or Group
Fan Fave International Artist or Group
Fan Fave Much Creator

Former 
Best Comedy Video
Best Cinematography
Best Watched Video

Most wins
Artist with the most awards: Justin Bieber (12), Our Lady Peace (10), and Billy Talent (10)

Justin Bieber:
 2010 International Video of the Year By a Canadian, "Baby"
 2010 Your Fave: Video, "Baby"
 2010 Your Fave: New Artist, "Baby"
 2011 International Video of the Year by a Canadian, "Somebody to Love"
 2011 Your Fave: Artist, "Somebody to Love"
 2012 International Video of the Year by a Canadian, "Boyfriend"
 2012 Your Fave: Artist or Group, "Justin Bieber"
 2013 Your Fave: Artist or Group, "Justin Bieber"
 2014 Your Fave: Artist or Group, "Justin Bieber"
 2015 Fan Fave Artist or Group, "Justin Bieber"
 2016 Fan Fave Artist or Group, "Justin Bieber"
 2017 Fan Fave Artist or Group, "Justin Bieber"

Our Lady Peace:
 1997 Your Fave: Group, "Superman's Dead"
 1997 Your Fave: Video, "Superman's Dead"
 1998 Your Fave: Group, "4 A.M."
 2000 Your Fave: Group, "One Man Army"
 2000 Your Fave: Video, "One Man Army"
 2001 Video of the Year, "In Repair"
 2001 Director of the Year, "In Repair"
 2001 Post-Productionof the Year, "In Repair"
 2003 Video of the Year, "Innocent"
 2003 Cinematography of the Year, "Innocent"

Billy Talent:
 2004 Best Rock Video, "Try Honesty"
 2005 Best Rock Video, "River Below"
 2005 Best Video, "River Below"
 2007 Best Rock Video, "Fallen Leaves"
 2007 Best Video, "Fallen Leaves"
 2007 Your Fave: Group, "Devil in a Midnight Mass"
 2009 Best International Video by a Canadian, "Rusted from the Rain"
 2010 Best Director, Michael Maxxis for "Saint Veronika"
 2010 Best Rock Video, "Devil on My Shoulder"
 2013 Post-Production Video of the Year, "Surprise, Surprise"

Artist with the most awards won for the same category: Justin Bieber for "Your Fave: Artist or Group"
 2011 Your Fave: Artist, "Somebody to Love"
 2012 Your Fave: Artist or Group, "Justin Bieber"
 2013 Your Fave: Artist or Group, "Justin Bieber"
 2014 Your Fave: Artist or Group, "Justin Bieber"
 2015 Your Fave: Artist or Group, "Justin Bieber"
 2016 Your Fave: Artist or Group, "Justin Bieber"
 2017 Your Fave: Artist or Group, "Justin Bieber"

The "Your Fave: Artist" award has been changed to "Your Fave: Artist or Group".

Artists with the most nominations in one night: Matthew Good Band in 2000 (11)

Video of the Year, "Load Me Up" (Winner)
Video of the Year, "Strange Days"
Rock Video of the Year, "Hello Time Bomb"
Rock Video of the Year, "Load Me Up" (Winner)
Director of the Year, "Load Me Up"
Director of the Year, "Strange Days"
Post-Production of the Year, "Load Me Up"
Cinematography of the Year, "Load Me Up"
Cinematography of the Year, "Strange Days"
Your Fave: Group, "Hello Time Bomb"
Your Fave: Video, "Hello Time Bomb"

Artists with the most awards in one night:

Swollen Members f. Moka Only (4 in 2002)
Director of the Year, "Fuel Injected"
VideoFACT Award, "Fuel Injected"
Independent Video, "Fuel Injected"
Hip Hop Video of the Year, "Fuel Injected"

k-os (4 in 2005)
Director of the Year, "Man I Used To Be"
Pop Video of the Year, "Crabbuckit"
Cinematography of the Year, "Man I Used To Be"
Hip Hop Video of the Year, "Man I Used To Be"

Hedley (4 in 2008)
Video of the Year, "For the Nights I Can’t Remember"
Director of the Year, "For the Nights I Can't Remember"
Cinematography of the Year, "She's So Sorry"
Rock Video of the Year, "She's So Sorry"
|}

Artists with the most MuchMusic Awards since 2003:

 Justin Bieber (12)
 Billy Talent (10)
 Our Lady Peace (10)
 Avril Lavigne (8)
 Hedley (7)
 Nickelback (6)
 Nelly Furtado (6)
 Simple Plan (5)
 k-os (4)
 Swollen Members (4)
 Drake (3)
 Belly (3)
 Rihanna (3)
 Lady Gaga (3)
 The Midway State (3)
 Sam Roberts (3)
 Fifth Harmony (2)
 Alexisonfire (2)
 Katy Perry (2)
 Linkin Park (2)
 Lorde (2)
 Shania Twain (2)
 Treble Charger (2)
 Kardinal Offishall (2)
 Fall Out Boy (2)
 Trey Songz (2)
 Jonas Brothers (2)
 Marianas Trench (1)
 Hilary Duff (1)
 Demi Lovato (1)
 Taylor Swift (1)
 Ariana Grande (1)
 Selena Gomez (1)

See also

Music of Canada

References

External links
Official website
Much.com

Canadian music awards
Awards established in 1990
Awards disestablished in 2018
1990s Canadian music television series
1990 in Canadian music
2000s Canadian music television series
2010s Canadian music television series